Choi Jung-min (born 12 January 1998) is a South Korean swimmer. She competed in the women's 800 metre freestyle event at the 2017 World Aquatics Championships.

References

External links
 

1998 births
Living people
Place of birth missing (living people)
Swimmers at the 2018 Asian Games
Asian Games competitors for South Korea
South Korean female freestyle swimmers
21st-century South Korean women